Year's Best SF 14 is a science fiction anthology edited by David G. Hartwell and Kathryn Cramer that was published in 2009.  It is the fourteenth in the Year's Best SF series.

Contents

The book itself, as well as each of the stories, has a short introduction by the editors.

 Carolyn Ives Gilman: "Arkfall" (Originally in F&SF, 2008)
 Neil Gaiman: "Orange" (Originally in The Starry Rift, 2008)
 Kathleen Ann Goonan: "Memory Dog" (Originally in Asimov's, 2008)
 Paolo Bacigalupi: "Pump Six" (Originally in Pump Six and Other Stories, 2008)
 Elizabeth Bear & Sarah Monette: "Boojum" (Originally in Fast Ships, Black Sails, 2008)
 Ted Chiang: "Exhalation" (Originally in Eclipse 2, 2008)
 M. Rickert: "Traitor" (Originally in F&SF, 2008)
 Cory Doctorow: "The Things that Make Me Weak and Strange Get Engineered Away" (Originally published online by Tor Books, 2008)
 Vandana Singh: "Oblivion: A Journey" (Originally in Clockwork Phoenix, 2008)
 Robert Reed: "The House Left Empty" (Originally in Asimov's, 2008)
 Michael Swanwick: "The Scarecrow’s Boy" (Originally in F&SF, 2008)
 Ted Kosmatka: "N-Words" (Originally in Seeds of Change, 2008)
 Alastair Reynolds: "Fury" (Originally in Eclipse 2, 2008)
 Gwyneth Jones (as Ann Halam): "Cheats" (Originally in The Starry Rift, 2008)
 Jason Sanford: "The Ships Like Clouds, Risen By Their Rain" (Originally in Interzone, 2008)
 Mary Rosenblum: "The Egg Man" (Originally in Asimov's, 2008)
 Daryl Gregory: "Glass" (Originally in MIT Technology Review, 2008)
 Jeff VanderMeer: "Fixing Hanover" (Originally in Extraordinary Engines, 2008)
 Rudy Rucker: "Message Found in a Gravity Wave" (Originally in Nature Physics, 2008)
 Tobias Buckell & Karl Schroeder: "Mitigation" (Originally in Fast Forward 2, 2008)
 Sue Burke: "Spiders" (Originally in Asimov's, 2008)

External links

 "The Things that Make Me Weak and Strange Get Engineered Away" on Tor's website.

2009 anthologies
Year's Best SF anthology series
Eos Books books
2000s science fiction works